Jacob Johann Hagenbach (1802? in Basle – 1 January 1825) was a Swiss entomologist.

Works
Insectorum Helvetiae exhibientia vel species novas vel nondum depictas. Basileae, vol. 12, fasc. 1, 48 pp. + 15 pl.(1822) 
Insecta Coleoptrata, quae in itineribus suis, praesertim alpinis, collegerunt David Henricus Hoppe, Dr., et Fridericus Hornschuch, Dr., A. C. N. C. S. S. cum notis et descriptionibus Iacobi Sturm et Iacobi Hagenbach. Nova Acta Phys.Med. Acad. Caes. Leop.-Carol., 12 (2): 477-490, pl. XLV. (1825)

External links
Johann Wolfgang Goethe Universität Edocs
Dprs of the 1822 Basel edition of Symbola faunae insectorum Helvetiae exhibentia vel species novas nondum depictas; downloadable PDF format
Volume 1
Volume 2

Swiss entomologists
1802 births
Year of birth uncertain
1825 deaths